KNBX-CD, virtual channel 31 (UHF digital channel 14), is a low-powered, Class A television station licensed to Las Vegas, Nevada, United States, which airs Armenian-language programming on its primary subchannel. The station is owned by HC2 Holdings. KNBX-CD's transmitter is located on Mount Arden near Henderson, Nevada.

History
KNBX-CD (meaning Nevada BoX) was owned by Equity Media Holdings and previously broadcast programming from TeleFórmula. Before that, it had aired programming from MTV2. Like most over-the-air MTV2 affiliates, it was an affiliate of The Box until that network's acquisition by Viacom in 2001.

KNBX-CD was sold at auction to Mako Communications on April 16, 2009. Most recently, it operated as a translator of Azteca América affiliate KMCC (channel 34).

Digital channels
The station's digital signal is multiplexed:

References

Low-power television stations in the United States
NBX-CD
Television channels and stations established in 1998
1998 establishments in Nevada